In cricket, a five-wicket haul (also known as a "five–for" or "fifer") refers to a bowler taking five or more wickets in a single innings. This is regarded by the critics as a notable achievement, and there have been only 64 instances of a bowler taking a five-wicket haul in World Cup tournaments. The Cricket World Cup is the international championship of One Day International (ODI) cricket. The event is organised by the sport's governing body, the International Cricket Council (ICC), and is held once in every four years.  In addition, players from four associate members of the ICC have taken five-wicket hauls in World Cups.

Starting with the inaugural edition in 1975, a total of 56 players have taken five-wicket haul in the championship as of 2019. Australia's Dennis Lillee became the first player take a five-wicket haul when he took five wickets for 34 runs against Pakistan in the third match of the world cup. His compatriot Gary Gilmour picked up two consecutive five-wicket haulsin the semi-final against England and the final against West Indiesin the edition. The first of the two, six wickets for 14 runs, was named the "Best Bowling Performance" in ODIs in an all-time list released by the Wisden Cricketers' Almanack in 2002. Joel Garner is the only other player to take a five-wicket haul in a World Cup final. He took five wickets for 38 runs against England in the 1979 tournament final; the performance ensured West Indies' victory and helped them retain the title.

The 1992 edition was the only tournament where no five-wicket hauls were taken, while the 2003 tournament had a record 12 five-wicket hauls taken by 11 different players. Australia's Mitchell Starc has taken three five-wicket hauls while six othersGilmour, Ashantha de Mel, Glenn McGrath, Vasbert Drakes, Shahid Afridi and Mustafizur Rahman have taken two in the history of the tournament. McGrath's seven wickets for 15 runs against Namibia remains the best bowling figures World Cup matches.

Key
 Inn  The innings of the match in which the five-wicket haul was taken
 Overs  Overs bowled in the innings
 Runs  Runs conceded in the innings
 Wkts  Batsmen whose wickets were taken in the innings
 Econ  Runs conceded per over
 Won  The match was won by the bowler's team
 Lost  The match was lost by the bowler's team
 Tied  The match ended in a tie
   One of two five-wicket hauls in the match
   Best bowling figures in World Cup up to that point

Five-wicket hauls

Notes and references

Footnotes

Citations

Bibliography

 
 

Cricket World Cup
Five-wicket hauls
Cricket World Cup
Five-wicket hauls